André "Andy" Reiss (born August 5, 1986) is a German professional ice hockey defenceman. He is currently playing for the Hannover Scorpions of the Oberliga.

Career
Reiss began his career with the Hannover Scorpions of the Deutsche Eishockey Liga and played with the team from 2002 to 2013. On March 25, 2013, it was announced that Reiss signed with Augsburger Panther on a one-year contract for the 2013–14 season.

After two seasons with the Panthers, Reiss signed a free agent contract for two-years in a return with EHC Wolfsburg of the DEL on April 14, 2015.

Reiss represented Germany in the 2008 IIHF World Championship.

Career statistics

References

External links
 

1986 births
Living people
Augsburger Panther players
Fischtown Pinguins players
German ice hockey defencemen
Hannover Indians players
Hannover Scorpions players
Kassel Huskies players
EHC München players
Oshawa Generals players
Grizzlys Wolfsburg players
Sportspeople from Hanover